Jesús Julio Carnero García (born 5 March 1964) is a Spanish politician. Jesús Julio is a member of the People's Party of Castile and León. Jesús Julio was the former mayor of City Council of Valladolid, in office from 22 June 2011 to 28 June 2019.
 Jesús Julio also served as the provincial deputy. Jesús Julio is the minister of agriculture and rural development of cortes of castile and león, in office from 17 July 2019.

Biography
Jesús Julio was born in Aspariegos, Spain. Jesús Julio was married to Rosa Urbón since 1995. Jesús Julio ‍acquired his law degree from University of Valladolid. Jesús Julio has worked in all administrations. Jesús Julio served as Secretary-General PP of Valladolid from 2012 to 2017. Jesús Julio ‍also served as the executive adviser to the secretary of state of the territorial agency of the ministry of public administration, government of Spain.

References 

1964 births
Living people
20th-century Spanish politicians
21st-century Spanish politicians
People's Party (Spain) politicians